The 1956 UK & Ireland Greyhound Racing Year was the 30th year of greyhound racing in the United Kingdom and Ireland.

Roll of honour

Summary
Attendances and Totalisator turnover had stabilised, with the latter resulting in a turnover of around £55 million. The Churches' Council on gambling quoted a figure of £119 million but that figure was for total gambling spend within the industry. One problem for the industry was the fact that the biggest names Spanish Battleship, Rushton Mac and Pauls Fun had all retired leaving the search for a new star.

Competitions
No single greyhound was able to secure more than one classic race success, the main Derby titles went to Dunmore King and Keep Moving. The 1956 English Greyhound Derby runner-up Duet Leader won the Laurels at Wimbledon Stadium and the Derby final third Gulf of Darien, reached the St Leger final at Wembley and the Cesarewitch at West Ham Stadium. The Welsh Greyhound Derby failed to take place again.

Shipping magnate Noel Purvis, who owned two of the 1956 Derby finalists gained consolation when Belingas Customer won the Scurry Gold Cup over 400 yards, a distance better suited to the greyhound than the Derby distance.

Ireland
The main interest in Ireland was in regard to Prince of Bermuda, the brindle dog owned by Ned Buckley was considered to be the fastest greyhound in training at the time but had disappointed in the 1956 Irish Greyhound Derby final. A match race was organised between Prince of Bermuda, Northern King and Duet Leader at White City which ended with the Irish hound coming out best, he was subsequently retired to stud.

Principal UK races

References 

Greyhound racing in the United Kingdom
Greyhound racing in the Republic of Ireland
UK and Ireland Greyhound Racing Year
UK and Ireland Greyhound Racing Year
UK and Ireland Greyhound Racing Year
UK and Ireland Greyhound Racing Year